Mordellistena gardneri is a beetle in the genus Mordellistena of the family Mordellidae. It was described in 1930 by Blair.

References

gardneri
Beetles described in 1930